Ark Park is a virtual reality spin-off game of Ark: Survival Evolved.

Gameplay 
Ark Park features over a hundred species of dinosaurs.  The game features different areas with unique scenery to explore.  The player can gather and craft things.  Eggs can be found in the park which players can use to raise their own dinosaurs.  The game also features a story mode where the player must defend a base against dinosaurs using a variety of weapons.

Reception 
Shacknews compared Ark Park to the Jurassic Park franchise.

References

External link 
  

2018 video games
PlayStation 4 games
Survival video games
Video games developed in the United States
virtual reality games
Windows games